Félix Stevens (born March 8, 1964) is a retired male sprinter from Cuba, who competed in the 1980s and the early 1990s for his native country. He set his personal best in the men's 200 metres event (20.24) on July 7, 1989 at a meet in Sofia, Bulgaria.

International competitions

  Extra guest final

References

Profile

1964 births
Living people
Cuban male sprinters
Pan American Games gold medalists for Cuba
Pan American Games medalists in athletics (track and field)
Athletes (track and field) at the 1987 Pan American Games
Athletes (track and field) at the 1991 Pan American Games
Universiade medalists in athletics (track and field)
Goodwill Games medalists in athletics
Central American and Caribbean Games gold medalists for Cuba
Competitors at the 1986 Central American and Caribbean Games
Universiade silver medalists for Cuba
Central American and Caribbean Games medalists in athletics
Medalists at the 1989 Summer Universiade
Competitors at the 1990 Goodwill Games
Medalists at the 1991 Pan American Games
20th-century Cuban people